Storkow (Mark) is a town in Oder-Spree district, in Brandenburg, Germany.

Geography
The municipal area comprises several lakes of the Dahme-Heideseen Nature Park; in the south, the Spreewald biosphere reserve stretches into Lower Lusatia.

Division of the town 
The following villages of the former Amt Storkow were incorporated into the present municipality with effect from 26 October 2003:

The municipalities of Alt Stahnsdorf, Limsdorf, Schwerin, Wochowsee had merged with the town of Storkow on 31 March 2002. Storkow proper already included the hamlets of Karlslust, Neu Boston and Wolfswinkel.

The villages of Philadelphia and Neu Boston were named after their American counterparts by Frederick the Great in 1772.

History 

The town of Storkow was first mentioned in a 1209 deed issued by Emperor Otto IV; it thereby is one of the oldest towns in Brandenburg. In early medieval times, the area was settled by Polabian Slavs, it was incorporated by the Saxon margrave Gero in his vast marca Geronis and by 965 formed part of the Imperial March of Lusatia (or Saxon Eastern March). During the German Ostsiedlung migration, maybe under the rule of the Wettin margrave Conrad the Great in the mid 12th century, Storkow Castle was erected. It probably arose at the site of a former Slavic marsh fortress and served as administrative seat of Wettin ministeriales ruling over the extended Lusatian lordship (Herrschaft) of Storkow.

With Lower Lusatia, Storkow passed to the Lands of the Bohemian Crown in 1367; it was located near the northern border with the Margraviate of Brandenburg. From 1518, Storkow Castle was pawned to the Bishops of Lebus as an episcopal residence. Upon the death of the last Catholic bishop in 1555, it was presented as a gift to the Hohenzollern margrave John of Brandenburg-Küstrin by King Ferdinand I of Bohemia and, together with neighbouring Beeskow, finally merged into the Brandenburg electorate upon John's death in 1571.

Lower Sorbian was spoken by a significant proportion of the population until the early 17th century.
Devastated during the Thirty Years' War, Storkow Castle was rebuilt in a Renaissance style under the rule of the "Great Elector" Frederick William. The town became part of the newly established Kingdom of Prussia in 1701. King Frederick the Great decisively promoted the local trade of weavers, bleachers and dyers.

In January, 1946, Storkow issued 16 postage stamps of its own, the final two semi-postals to raise funds for "victims of fascism." After World War II, Storkow was incorporated into the Bezirk Frankfurt of East Germany from 1952 to 1990. Storkow Castle was destroyed by a blaze in 1978; it was rebuilt after German reunification and today is a listed monument.

Demography

Politics

Seats in the town's assembly (Stadtverordnetenversammlung) as of 2014 local elections:
Social Democratic Party of Germany (SPD): 4
Free Voters: 4
Wählergruppe Neues Storkow (independent): 3
The Left: 2
Christian Democratic Union (CDU): 2
National Democratic Party of Germany (NPD): 1
Johann Kney: 1
Haus und Grund e.V.: 1

Twin towns — sister cities

Storkow is twinned with:
 Opalenica, Poland, since 2003

External links 
Municipal site

References

Localities in Oder-Spree